Maccabi Kabilio Jaffa F.C. is an Israeli football club from Jaffa, Tel Aviv. Founded in 2007 as a phoenix football club by fans of Maccabi Jaffa F.C., which was dissolved in 2000 and all previous attempts in the intervening years to revive it were unsuccessful.

History
Before the beginning of the 2008–09 season, some of Maccabi Jaffa's old fans gathered and reestablished the team under the name Maccabi Kabilio Jaffa (the team is being called after its goalkeeper in the 1970s Herzl Kabilio who died from cancer at the age of 35). The club is a fan's club, and gains its money from the donations made by the fans. The team was registered for the 2008–09 season for the bottom league in Israel, Liga Gimel.

In that season, Jaffa won the Israeli State Cup for Liga Gimel, and finished in the first place of the Tel Aviv division, with only one loss. Jaffa played the promotion game against Ironi Beit Dagan in Bloomfield Stadium in front of 9,000 fans.

Jaffa played in Liga Bet in the season of 2009–10. in this season Jaffa made history when they became the first club from Liga Bet, since 1963, to reach the Round of 16 of the Israeli State Cup. In the way to this phase, Jaffa won against Hapoel Hadera from Liga Alef and Ironi Kiryat Shmona which won the second division in that season. In the Round of 16 to the Final, Jaffa lost 0–5 to Hapoel Tel Aviv, which eventually went to win both the State Cup and the Premier League in that season.

During the season, Jaffa won the Israeli State Cup for Liga Bet, and finished the season in the first place with no losses. Maccabi Kabilio Jaffa was the only team in Israel, which was undefeated during the entire 2009–10 season.

Jaffa started its third season in Liga Alef, the third league in Israel. In this season, Jaffa broke their winning sequence, when they lost to Maccabi Ironi Netivot in Netivot. The loss came after 65 consecutive games without a loss, the longest period of time in which an Israeli team played without losing.

Jaffa finished the season in fourth place and qualified for the promotion play-offs. After beating Bnei Eilat, Maccabi Kiryat Malakhi and Asi Gilboa in the Liga Alef play-offs, Jaffa faced the 14th placed in 2010–11 Liga Leumit, Hakoah Ramat Gan. Jaffa lost the first leg in their home stadium in Holon by a result of 1–2, and the second leg in Ramat Gan ended in 1–1 draw. Thus, Maccabi Kabilio Jaffa remained in Liga Alef.

Jaffa finished as runners-up for third successive seasons, in 2011–12, 2012–13 and 2013–14. However, they failed to achieve promotion to Liga Leumit, after losing to Beitar Kfar Saba in the first round of the promotion play-offs, in 2012–13 and 2013–14.

In the 2014–15 season, Jaffa surprisingly found itself in the battle against relegation and finished in the 14th place. However, they survived in Liga Alef, after beating the Liga Bet South play-offs winner, Hapoel Kiryat Ono, by a result of 2–0, in the Relegation play-offs.

Maccabi Kabilio Jaffa steadied themselves in the Liga Alef South division. The 2015-16 season was their sixth consecutive in that league.

Current squad
 As of 19 August 2022

Honours
Fourth tier
Champions 2009–10
Sixth tier
Champions 2008–09

References

External links
 Maccabi Kabilio Jaffa – The Official Website 
Maccabi Jaffa Kabilio Israel Football Association 

Maccabi Jaffa F.C.
Jaffa
Jaffa
Football clubs in Tel Aviv
Association football clubs established in 2007
2000 disestablishments in Israel
2007 establishments in Israel
Fan-owned football clubs
Bulgarian Jews in Israel
Arab-Israeli football clubs